Walther Klemm (June 18, 1883 – August 11, 1957) was a German painter, printmaker, and illustrator.

He was born in Karlsbad and studied at the University of Applied Arts Vienna and the University of Vienna. In 1904 he exhibited with the Vienna Secession and moved to Prague and established a studio with Carl Thiemann. Klemm and Thiemann moved to the Dachau art colony in 1908 and both joined the Berlin Secession and Deutscher Künstlerbund around 1910.

Klemm was appointed professor of graphics at the Weimar Saxon Grand Ducal Art School in 1913 and after the Second World War aided in the reconstruction of the Weimar Art School. In 1952 he was named an honorary senator of the Weimar School of Architecture and Civil and Structural Engineering (now absorbed by the Bauhaus University, Weimar). He died in 1957 in Weimar.

In 1928 he won a bronze medal in the art competitions of the Olympic Games for his "Schlittschuhlaufen" ("Skating"). In 1953 he received the Nordgau-Kulturpreis for visual art.

References

Further reading
 "Klemm, Walther". In: Hans Vollmer (ed.): Allgemeines Lexikon der Bildenden Künstler von der Antike bis zur Gegenwart. Begründet von Ulrich Thieme und Felix Becker. Band 20: Kaufmann–Knilling. E. A. Seemann, Leipzig 1927, pp. 470–472
 Florian Hufnagl: "Klemm, Walther". In: Neue Deutsche Biographie (NDB). Band 12, Duncker & Humblot, Berlin 1980, p. 32 f. (online version)
 Walther Klemm und Carl Thiemann. Zwei Meister des Farbholzschnitts. Katalog Gemäldegalerie Dachau. Dachau 2016,

External links
 DatabaseOlympics profile
 Artnet.de: Klemm
 ArtofthePrint.com: Klemm
Literary estate of Walther Klemm in the Sächsische Landesbibliothek – Staats- und Universitätsbibliothek Dresden

1883 births
1957 deaths
20th-century German painters
20th-century German male artists
German male painters
Olympic bronze medalists in art competitions
Medalists at the 1928 Summer Olympics
Academic staff of Bauhaus University, Weimar
Olympic competitors in art competitions